Colonel Thomas Brooke Jr. of Brookefield (1660 – 1731) was President of the Council in Maryland and acting 13th Proprietary Governor of the Province of Maryland. He was the son of Major Thomas Brooke Sr. and Esquire (1632–1676) and his second wife Eleanor Hatton (1642–1725) who later remarried Col. Henry Darnall (1645-1711).

In 1720, he was elected President of the Governor's Council, (upper house of the colonial Maryland General Assembly) and acting (12th), Governor of Maryland from the departure of 11th Gov. John Hart until the arrival of Charles Calvert, fifth Lord Baltimore (1699-1751). Brooke Jr. was replaced as the 14th governor by Captain Charles Calvert, (1638-1754), cousin of the Lord Baltimore, and a Calvert family loyalist.

Biography
Thomas was born in 1660 near  Nottingham, Prince George's County, Maryland, in Calvert (after 1696 Prince George's) Co., Maryland.  He was commissioned Major of the Militia and promoted to Colonel.

Career

Thomas was one of the Justices for Calvert County.  Thomas was a justice of the peace for  Calvert County in 1679-1681; 1685-1689. Thomas was a vestryman of St. Paul's Parish, Calvert County.  He was removed from his justiceship probably due to his opposition to the revolution Protestant Associators in 1689.  He was nominated by Charles Calvert (1637–1715), 3rd Lord Baltimore to become a member of the first royal Council, commonly known as the Upper House, on August 26, 1691.  He was probably appointed in an effort to mollify the proprietor after his loss of the colony.  Thomas served as a member of the Council of Maryland from 1692-1707.  He took the oath of office as a justice of the Provincial Court on May 1, 1694.  He was appointed Deputy Secretary of Maryland the following year, and in 1699 was Commissary General of the Province.

Thomas was dismissed from all offices by the Governor of Maryland, John Seymour, (1649–1709), in 1708 as a result of close Roman Catholic ties - his brothers were Jesuits and Col. Henry Darnall (1645–1711) was his stepfather-and for poor Council attendance, although his attendance had been very regular prior to Seymour's governorship.  Brooke was reappointed to the same position after the colony reverted to proprietary control, and served from 1715-1722.

Governor of Maryland
In 1720 he was elected President of the Council, and acting Governor of Maryland from the departure of Gov. John Hart until the arrival of Charles Calvert, 5th Baron Baltimore. He was replaced as governor by Captain Charles Calvert, cousin of Lord Baltimore, and a Calvert family loyalist.

The reason for his second dismissal from the Council in 1722, is unclear.  Unlike his parents and brothers, he was a member of the Church of England and reared his family in that faith.  He was one of the first vestryman of St. Paul's Parish.

Thomas resided at "Brookefield", his estate on Mattaponi Creek near the Patuxent River, which he inherited from his father.  The land was formerly in Calvert County, but in 1696 became Prince George's County when it was formed.  In addition to "Brookefield", Col. Brooke also laid out several other tracts of land in Calvert County including:  "The Gore", laid out on June 10, 1680; "Brookes Chance", on July 13, 1680; "Addition to Brooke Chance", on June 10, 1685; "Hogg Pen", on June 12, 1685; "Addition to Brookefield", on March 29, 1688; "The Grove Landing", on July 10, 1688; "The Forrest", on Sep. 5, 1694; "Dan" on September 6, 1694; "Brookes Discovery", on Dec. 10, 1695; and "The Prospect", on Dec. 11, 1695.  At the time of his death on January 7, 1730 at "Brookefield", Thomas had amassed over 7,000 acres (28 km²) of land, in which a majority was heavily mortgaged.  His estate value was listed at 1,374 pounds, including proceeds of the sale of land, and 36 slaves.

Marriages

In about 1679 he married Anne Addison.  He had by her four children, and she died in about 1684.

Thomas married as his second wife, Barbara Dent (1676–1754).  Barbara was born in 1676 in St. Mary's Co., Maryland, and died June 26, 1754 in Calvert Co., Maryland.

Barbara was the daughter of Col. Thomas Dent Sr., Gent. (1630–1676) and Rebecca Wilkinson (1633–1726).

Children

By first wife Mary Baker:
 Baker Brooke 1680
Benjamin Brooke Sr. (1680–1727), who married Eleanor Bowie (1709–1790), who married secondly, Mr. Skinner.  Eleanor was the daughter of John Bowie Sr., Gent. (ca. 1688–1752) and Mary Mullikin
Eleanor Brooke (1683–1756), who 1st married John Seawall, son of Colonel Thomas Seawall (b. 1712-d.1790) and Mary Rwbbeca Hansford. 2) Charles Seawall (1735–1742) son of Major Nicholas Lowe Seawall (1712–1790) and Susanna Burgess (1713–1790) 
Elizabeth Brooke (1683–1748), who married Col. George Beale (1695–1780), son of Col. Ninian Beale Sr. (1625–1717) and Ruth Moore (d. ca. 1717).
Jane Brooke (1685–1779), who married Alexander Contee (1693–1740), son of Dr. Peter Contee (1714) and his first wife, Catherine.
John Brooke (1687–1727)
Lucy Brooke (1687), who married Thomas Hodgkin. He was a planter in Prince George Co. Md. 
(b. 1687)
Mary Brooke (1689–1758), who married Dr. Patrick Sim (d. 1740).
Nathaniel Brooke (1689–1780)
Priscilla Brooke (1690–1760), who married Hon. Thomas Gantt Jr., Gent. (d. 1763), son of Edward Gantt and Ann Baker.
Rebecca Brooke (1692–1768), who married Capt. John Howard (ca. 1691-1741), son of Edmond Howard (1659–1712) and Margaret Dent (1662–1712).
Col. William Dent Sr., Gent. (1660–1705), and wife Barbara Dent 
 Sarah Brooke (1694–1732)1 married Capt. Philip Lee Sr., Hon., Esq. (1681–1744), son of Col. Richard Lee II, Esq. (1647–1715) and Laetitia Corbin (ca. 1657–1706). 
Thomas Brooke III (1696–1744/45), who married Lucy Smith (1688–1770), daughter of Col. Walter Smith Sr. (1676–1711) and Rachel Hall (1671–1730).
Thomas Brooke (1717–1768), unmarried. <Maryland Genealogies, Vol. 1, Pg.100>

.

Ancestry

Thomas  Brooke Jr., was the son of  Paternal Grandfather Maj. Thomas Brooke Sr., Esq. (1632–1676), and he was the son of Paternal Great-Grandfather Gov. Robert Brooke Sr., Esq. (1602–1655) and his first wife, Paternal Great-Grandmother Mary Baker (1602–1634), and she was the daughter of Thomas Baker II  and Mary Engham.

and his second wife Paternal Grandmother Eleanor Hatton  (1642–1725),  and she was the daughter of  Maternal Grandfather Capt. Richard Hatton (1605-1648) and  he was the son of

Maternal Great-Grandfather John Hatton
and Maternal Great-Grandmother Margaret Austin

Grandmother Margaret Banks, and she was daughter of  Maternal Grandfather Capt. Richard Banks Sr. (ca. 1612–1667).
After the death of Maj. Thomas Brooke Sr., Esq. (1632–1676), Eleanor married Col. Henry Darnall (1645–1711) of "Woodyard" and "Darnall's Delight", making Col. Thomas Brooke Jr. (1660–1730), the stepson of Col. Darnall and the half brother of Henry Darnall II, Esq. (d. 1737).

Robert Brooke Sr., was the son of Judge Thomas Brooke (1561–1612) and Susan Foster (ca. 1570-1612).

Susan was the daughter of Sir Thomas Foster V (1548–1612) of "Etherstone", Hertford, England, and his wife, Susan Foster (1548–1625), co-heiress with her sister Constance.

Thomas  (1561–1612)| was the son of Richard Brooke Sr., Gent., Esq. (1519–1594) and Elizabeth Twyne (1523–1599).
Richard was the son of  Robert Brooke (d. 1593), and he was the son of Thomas Brooke 
son Gent, & esquire  Richard Brooke Sr. (1519-1599)
Elizabeth Twyne (1523-1599|}

and he married Margaret Grosner

Thomas Brooke and Mary Baker were married 4 Jan 1680,

Baker (b. 12 Jan. 1680), and Benjamin Brooke Sr. (1680-1727)
Eleanor Brooke (b.1680-d1742), Elizabeth Brooke (b. 1683- d.1748)

John Brooke 
Nathaniel Brooke, 
Priscilla Brooke and after the birth of Sarah

See also
List of colonial governors of Maryland

Notes

References
Brook Family Genealogy
Maryland State Archives: St. Mary's City Men's Career Files MSA SC 5094  Brooke Thomas (1659-1731)

Maryland lawyers
Colonial Governors of Maryland
1659 births
1730s deaths